The Calvin Coolidge Presidential Library and Museum is the presidential library of 30th U.S. president Calvin Coolidge.

Location
The library is located at the Forbes Library in Northampton, Massachusetts, where Coolidge practiced law and served as mayor.

Foundation
The Coolidge Library began in 1920 when Coolidge began donating various records and memorabilia to the Forbes Library. This collection was furthered in 1956 when the Commonwealth of Massachusetts established the Calvin Coolidge Memorial Room at the behest of Grace Coolidge.

See also
 Coolidge Homestead
 Calvin Coolidge House
 Presidential memorials in the United States

Notes

External links
  
 Coolidge Foundation

Presidential Library and Museum
Coolidge
Libraries in Hampshire County, Massachusetts
Museums in Hampshire County, Massachusetts
Presidential museums in Massachusetts
Buildings and structures in Northampton, Massachusetts
1920 establishments in Massachusetts
History of Hampshire County, Massachusetts
Libraries established in 1920
Museums established in 1920